Mr. Prokouk is a character created by Karel Zeman for a series of Czech animated short films in the 1940s and 1950s.

Prokouk, a stop-motion animation puppet made of wood, is a sympathetic, irrepressible everyman character with a bristling mustache, a long nose, and a pork pie hat. The French newspaper Le Monde described the character as an "animated cousin" of Jacques Tati's character Monsieur Hulot, and the catalogue of a 2001 Karel Zeman retrospective at the Berkeley Art Museum and Pacific Film Archive suggested that Prokouk might be taken as Zeman's alter ego. The short films in which he appears are comic with a didactic touch.

The character first appeared in the 1946 short Podkova pro štěstí ("Horseshoe for Luck").

Prokouk became the most well-known character in Czech animated cinema and a familiar figure in Czech culture. The films were especially popular with young audiences.

Filmography
The following table is based on information from the Karel Zeman Museum's filmography.

References

1946 in animation
Prokouk, Mr.
Film series introduced in 1946
Prokouk, Mr.
Czechoslovak animated short films
Czech animated films
Czech short films
Prokouk, Mr.
Prokouk, Mr.
Karel Zeman